Yorkton was a federal electoral district in Saskatchewan, Canada, that was represented in the House of Commons of Canada from 1925 to 1968.

This riding was created in 1924 from parts of Mackenzie and Saltcoats ridings.

It was abolished in 1966 when it was redistributed into Regina East, Regina—Lake Centre and Yorkton—Melville  ridings.

Members of Parliament 

This riding elected the following Members of Parliament:

George Washington McPhee, Liberal (1925–1940)
George Hugh Castleden, Co-operative Commonwealth Federation (CCF) (1940–1949)
Alan Carl Stewart, Liberal (1949–1953)
George Hugh Castleden, CCF (1953–1958)
G. Drummond Clancy, Progressive Conservative (1958–1968)

Election results

See also
Yorkton Saskatchewan provincial electoral district
Yorkton Northwest Territories territorial electoral district
 List of Canadian federal electoral districts
 Past Canadian electoral districts

External links 
 

Former federal electoral districts of Saskatchewan